Harry Ronald Eaton (28 January 1909 – 13 May 1960) was an Australian cricketer. He played one first-class match for New South Wales in 1928/29.

See also
 List of New South Wales representative cricketers

References

External links
 

1909 births
1960 deaths
Australian cricketers
New South Wales cricketers
Cricketers from Sydney